Hovshaga AIF is a Swedish football club located in Växjö in Växjö Municipality, Kronoberg County.

Background
Hovshaga AIF (abbreviated as HAIF) is one of Småland's biggest sporting clubs and is based at the Hagavallen and Hovshaga sports hall. HAIF is active in football, bandy, floorball and tennis. There is also a table tennis section that is dormant at the moment.

The football club currently plays in Division 4 Sydvästra Småland which is the sixth tier of Swedish football. They play their home matches at the Hagavallen in Växjö.

The club is affiliated to Smålands Fotbollförbund.

The record for most appearances are held by Robin Backström which entered his 13th season in the club (2013) with 197 games for the first team.

Season to season

Footnotes

External links
 Hovshaga AIF – Official website

Football clubs in Kronoberg County
1986 establishments in Sweden